Kenneth Ikechukwu Ngwoke (born 29 March 1993) is a Nigerian professional footballer who plays as a forward for Saudi Second Division club Al-Nahda.

Career

Saif SC
On 11 November 2020, Ngwoke signed with Saif SC for the 2020–21 season in Bangladesh Football Premier League. On 23 December 2020, Ngwoke scores his 1st goal with Saif SC in 2020–21 Bangladesh Federation Cup.

Churchill Brothers
On 12 October 2021, Ngwoke signed with I-League club Churchill Brothers on a one-year deal.

On 4 March 2022, he scored his first goals for the club against RoundGlass Punjab, in a 2–2 draw.

Al-Nahda
On 27 July 2022, Ngwoke joined Saudi Arabian side Al-Nahda.

References

External links
Kenneth Ikechukwu at KTFF

1993 births
Living people
Nigerian footballers
Nigerian expatriate footballers
Persian Gulf Pro League players
Saudi Second Division players
Hamitköy S.K. players
Çetinkaya Türk S.K. players
Ismaily SC players
El Sharkia SC players
Paykan F.C. players
Al-Mina'a SC players
Al-Nahda Club (Saudi Arabia) players
Association football forwards
Expatriate footballers in Iran
Expatriate footballers in Northern Cyprus
Expatriate footballers in Saudi Arabia
Nigerian expatriate sportspeople in Iraq
Nigerian expatriate sportspeople in Egypt
Nigerian expatriate sportspeople in Iran
Nigerian expatriate sportspeople in Cyprus
Nigerian expatriate sportspeople in Bangladesh
Nigerian expatriate sportspeople in Saudi Arabia
Saif SC players